Ganjina (literally "treasure") is the Afghan version of the television gameshow Deal or No Deal. It premiered on May 30, 2010 and is broadcast on Tolo TV. The show was earlier hosted by the Afghan actor Rahim Mehrzad and was later taken over by Mukhtar Lashkari.

There are 20 boxes containing prizes from 1 Afghani to 1,000,000 Afghani (about US$12,800). There have been three top prize winners.

The last episode was aired on May 14, 2013. From May 15 to June 6, 2013 was a rerun of notable episodes, including celebrity editions and two of the top prize winning episodes. On June 8, 2013, the show was replaced by new game show 100 Sanya (literally "100 seconds"), an Afghan adaptation of Divided.

Box Values

References

Afghan television series
Deal or No Deal
2010 Afghan television series debuts
2013 Afghan television series endings